Turn Up The Music! is a Sammy Hagar compilation album and is named after one of his early fan favorite tracks. It is available with at least two different covers.

Song information
 Steve Perry appears on the track "Run For Your Life".
 Neal Schon appears on the track "Love Or Money".

Track listing
 "Trans Am (Highway Wonderland)" (Sammy Hagar) - 3:31
 "Plain Jane" (Sammy Hagar) - 3:48
 "The Iceman" (Sammy Hagar) - 4:12
 "Run For Your Life" (Steve Gould/Pidgeon) - 4:22
 "I've Done Everything for You" (Sammy Hagar) - 3:25
 "Rock 'N' Roll Weekend" (Sammy Hagar) - 3:43
 "Turn Up the Music" (John Carter/Sammy Hagar) - 5:46
 "Urban Guerilla" (John Carter/Sammy Hagar) - 2:52
 "Love or Money" (Sammy Hagar) - 3:57
 "Reckless" (Sammy Hagar) - 3:34

References

Sammy Hagar albums
1992 compilation albums